John "Jack" Gray (May 16, 1927 – March 30, 2018) was a Canadian football player who played for the Toronto Argonauts. He won the Grey Cup with them in 1952. He also attended and played football at the University of Toronto. After his football career, Jack moved to Deep River, Ontario where he had a long career as a teacher at Mackenzie High School and Superintendent of the Renfrew County School Board. Jack was also the first principal of the Deep River Science Academy. He died in March 2018 at the age of 91.

References

1927 births
2018 deaths
Toronto Argonauts players
Toronto Varsity Blues football players
University of Toronto alumni